Bobaraba is a national dance craze in Ivorian, South Africa and Mali inspired by DJ Mix and DJ Eloh's hit song Bobaraba, which means "big bottom" in the local Dyula language and in the Bambara language.

Ivorian footballers have adopted the moves and could be seen wiggling their bottoms in a curious on-pitch dance after each goal scored during the recent Africa Nations Cup.

External links
 Bobaraba - Dj Mix 1st and Eloh DJ (YouTube)

See also
 Bôtchô one of the "bottom enhancers"

African dances
Buttocks